Salaman is a surname. Notable people with the name include:

Abraham Salaman (1881/6–1941), New Zealand merchant, dyer, herbalist and charlatan
Annette Salaman (1827–1879), English Jewish writer
Charles Kensington Salaman (1814–1901), British pianist and composer
Chloe Salaman (born 1960), English film and television actress
Clara Salaman (born 1967), English actress
Esther Salaman (née Polianowsky) (1900–1995), Russian-born, English Jewish writer and physicist
Julia Salaman (1812–1906), British portrait painter
Malcolm Charles Salaman (1855–1940), English author, journalist and critic
Maureen Kennedy Salaman (1936–2006), American author, proponent of alternative medicine, 1984 candidate for US Vice President
Mohd Norizam Salaman (born 1984), Malaysian footballer who played as a striker
Nina Salaman (née Davis) (1877–1925), British Jewish poet, translator, and social activist
Paul Salaman (born 1971), ornithologist and conservationist based the Rainforest Trust in Latin America
Lady Rachel Simon (née Salaman) (1823–1899), English Jewish author
Raphael Salaman, FSA (1906–1993), English engineer, collector of hand tools and writer
Redcliffe N. Salaman (1874–1955), British botanist and potato breeder

See also
Notre Dame of Salaman College, Catholic educational institution in Lebak, Sultan Kudarat, Philippines
Prince Khalifa Bin Salaman Island, artificial island in the archipelago of Bahrain
Masjid-al-Salaman, city and capital of Masjed Soleyman County, Khuzestan Province, Iran
Salama (disambiguation)
Salamanca
Salamander (disambiguation)
Salamandra
Salamanga
Salamani
Salamansa